Danielle M. "Dani" Tyler (born October 23, 1974) is an American, former collegiate right-handed softball player and Olympic champion, originally from River Forest, Illinois. She played on the infield in several positions for the Drake Bulldogs in the Missouri Valley Conference, where she holds the school and ranks in the conference for career batting average records and was a three-time all-conference honoree. She later joined and won a gold medal at the 1996 Atlanta Olympics with Team USA.

Career

She competed at the 1996 Summer Olympics in Atlanta where she received a gold medal with the American team. Tyler collected three hits, scored a run with a triple and a double at the games.

Tyler played softball at Drake University.

Statistics

Drake Bulldogs

External links

References 

1974 births
Living people
Olympic softball players of the United States
Softball players from Illinois
Softball players at the 1996 Summer Olympics
Olympic gold medalists for the United States in softball
Drake Bulldogs softball players
Medalists at the 1996 Summer Olympics
People from River Forest, Illinois